Jodie Lee Taylor (born 17 May 1986) is an English professional footballer who plays as a striker for Arsenal of WSL. She began her club career with local team Tranmere Rovers and had brief spells in her home country with Birmingham City and Lincoln Ladies. A well-traveled player, she has also played abroad in the United States, Canada, Australia, Sweden and France.

Taylor represented England at youth level before making her senior international debut in 2014. She scored the opening goal in the 2–1 quarter-final win over hosts Canada at the 2015 FIFA Women's World Cup. England went on to win the bronze medal at the tournament. Taylor won the Golden Boot as top goalscorer at Euro 2017, scoring five goals in four appearances.

Early life
Born in Birkenhead, United Kingdom, Taylor made her first team debut for Tranmere Rovers in February 2002, at the age of 15, during a prolific season in youth football. That term she scored 109 goals across 125 games for Oldershaw School, Merseyside Under–16s and Tranmere's reserve team. She then scored on her first team debut in Tranmere's 5–1 win over Wolves in the FA Women's Cup fifth round.

When Tranmere were relegated in 2004 Taylor accepted a four-year scholarship to Oregon State University. She had scored 29 goals in 38 first team appearances for Tranmere, despite missing six months of action with a broken leg.

Club career
Taylor played for various teams in the North American USL W-League and in Australia for Melbourne Victory. She returned to England in 2011, signing for Birmingham City, but moving to Lincoln Ladies on loan. After she scored two goals in six games, Lincoln wanted to keep Taylor for the 2012 FA WSL season. But she returned to her parent club Birmingham City following another off-season stint in Australia with Melbourne Victory.

At the 2012 FA Women's Cup Final, Taylor scored in Birmingham's penalty shootout win over Chelsea. In January 2013, Taylor left Birmingham City for a one–year loan to Damallsvenskan team Kopparbergs/Göteborg FC. She scored ten goals in ten games for Göteborg but left during the summer break, returning to England for personal reasons. In December 2013, she signed with the Washington Spirit for the 2014 National Women's Soccer League season.

On 16 January 2015 the Portland Thorns FC acquired Taylor in a trade with the Washington Spirit in exchange for a 2015 second-round pick (No. 13 overall) and two-second-round picks in 2016. On 8 October 2015, defending W-League champions Canberra United announced that they had signed Taylor on loan, only for a recurrence of a knee injury to force her to pull out of the deal.

 
On 24 March 2016, Arsenal announced the signing of Taylor. Taylor did not make her debut in the FA WSL until the club's final home game of the 2016 season, scoring twice in a 2–0 win over relegated Doncaster Belles, having previously spent a large part of the campaign out injured.

Less than two years later, Taylor left Arsenal on 21 November 2017, having played seventeen matches for the club, scoring ten goals. She signed for Melbourne City FC in Australia on a short-term contract. On the same day, Reign FC announced that Taylor will join the club before the 2018 National Women's Soccer League season. By returning to the Pacific Northwest, she joins a select group of players who have played for both sides of the Cascadia rivalry with Seattle and the Portland Thorns FC: Michelle Betos, Amber Brooks, Danielle Foxhoven, Kaylyn Kyle, Allie Long and Jessica McDonald. She signed a new one-year contract, with an option for a further year, with Reign FC on 22 January 2020. In December 2020, while Taylor was still in France, OL Reign traded her NWSL playing rights along with Taylor Smith to North Carolina Courage in exchange for Ally Watt. In February 2021, Taylor's NWSL rights were once again traded, this time to Orlando Pride in exchange for Carson Pickett.

On 4 August 2020, Taylor joined French and European champions Lyon on a short-term deal until 31 December. On 30 August, she appeared as an 87th minute substitute for Dzsenifer Marozsán as Lyon beat Wolfsburg 3–1 in the 2020 UEFA Women's Champions League Final. In January 2021 it was announced her contract had been extended until the end of the season.

Having acquired her NWSL rights in February, Taylor signed with Orlando Pride through the end of the 2021 season on 8 July 2021.

On 1 December 2021, Taylor was traded from Orlando to San Diego Wave FC, a new NWSL expansion team managed by her former England teammate Casey Stoney.

On 17 March 2023, it was announced that Taylor would rejoin Arsenal for the remainder of the 2022–23 season.

International career

Newly appointed England coach Mark Sampson included Taylor in a 30-player squad for the annual training camp in La Manga Club, which included a match against Norway on 17 January 2014. She withdrew from the squad due to club commitments and was replaced by Isobel Christiansen.

In August 2014 Taylor made her debut in England's 4–0 friendly win over Sweden at Victoria Park in Hartlepool. She scored what would have been her first international goal in a friendly against the United States on 14 February 2015, only for it to be wrongly ruled out for offside.

On 6 March 2015, at the 2015 Cyprus Cup, Taylor scored a hat trick for England in their 3–0 group win against Australia. The win gave them a place in the finals. On her tenth appearance for England, at the 2015 FIFA Women's World Cup, Taylor capitalised on a mistake by Lauren Sesselmann of host nation Canada to put England 1–0 up in their quarter-final game. England went on to win 2–1 to secure their first ever semi-final appearance.

Taylor was selected as part of England's squad for UEFA Women's Euro 2017 and was given the number 9 shirt for the tournament. She scored a hat-trick in the team's 6–0 opening group match victory against Scotland, becoming the first Englishwoman to do so in a major tournament. She scored again in the next game as England beat Spain 2–0 and the only goal in a 1–0 quarter-final win over France as England reached the semi-finals. With five goals, Taylor won the tournament's golden boot, one ahead of Vivianne Miedema.

In May 2019, Phil Neville selected Jodie Taylor for England's 2019 FIFA Women's World Cup squad. She made three appearances and scored once in a group stage win over Argentina.

Personal life
Jodie was married to fellow footballer and New Zealand national team player Emma Kete.

Career statistics
Scores and results list England's goal tally first, score column indicates score after each Taylor goal.

Honours
Birmingham City
FA Cup: 2012

Göteborg
Svenska Supercupen: 2013

Melbourne City
W-League Championship: 2018

Lyon
UEFA Women's Champions League: 2019–20

England
FIFA Women's World Cup third place: 2015
SheBelieves Cup: 2019

Individual
UEFA Women's Championship Golden Boot: 2017
Vauxhall England Player of the Year: 2017

See also

List of England national football team hat-tricks
List of foreign NWSL players
List of foreign Damallsvenskan players
List of foreign Division 1 Féminine players
List of foreign W-League (Australia) players
List of Melbourne Victory Women players
W-League (Australia) all-time records
List of UEFA Women's Championship records

References

External links

Profile at The Football Association

1986 births
Living people
English women's footballers
Pali Blues players
Portland Thorns FC players
Melbourne Victory FC (A-League Women) players
Arsenal W.F.C. players
Birmingham City W.F.C. players
Tranmere Rovers L.F.C. players
BK Häcken FF players
Sydney FC (A-League Women) players
Washington Spirit players
Canberra United FC players
Melbourne City FC (A-League Women) players
Orlando Pride players
Women's Super League players
FA Women's National League players
A-League Women players
USL W-League (1995–2015) players
English expatriate women's footballers
English expatriate sportspeople in Australia
English expatriate sportspeople in Canada
English expatriate sportspeople in Sweden
English expatriate sportspeople in the United States
Expatriate women's soccer players in the United States
University of Oregon alumni
Expatriate women's footballers in Sweden
England women's under-23 international footballers
National Women's Soccer League players
Oregon State Beavers women's soccer players
England women's international footballers
2015 FIFA Women's World Cup players
Sportspeople from Birkenhead
Expatriate women's soccer players in Australia
Expatriate women's soccer players in Canada
OL Reign players
San Diego Wave FC players
Women's association football forwards
Universiade bronze medalists for Great Britain
Universiade medalists in football
2019 FIFA Women's World Cup players
British LGBT footballers
English LGBT sportspeople
Damallsvenskan players
Lesbian sportswomen
Medalists at the 2009 Summer Universiade
UEFA Women's Euro 2017 players
Ottawa Fury (women) players
Boston Renegades players